Monsieur Batignole is a French film released in 2002. The film was directed by Gérard Jugnot and featured Gérard Jugnot, Jules Sitruk, Jean-Paul Rouve, Götz Burger, Michèle Garcia and Alexia Portal in lead roles. The film depicts the story of an ordinary grocer, Edmond Batignole, who helps the young son of his Jewish neighbour, and the boy's two cousins, to reach Switzerland safely.

Plot
In 1942, in Paris, which was under German occupation during World War II, a grocer Edmond Batignole (Gérard Jugnot) is living with his family on the ground floor of an apartment building. He has a daughter who is soon to be married. His future son-in-law, an aspiring writer Pierre-Jean (Jean-Paul Rouve) wants the penthouse apartment occupied by a Jewish family, the Bernsteins, and alerts the Gestapo who capture the family early one morning. When the Bernsteins' property is confiscated, the Batignoles apply for and are awarded the apartment. The Batignoles cater a party for SS officials in the confiscated apartment. During the party, young Simon Bernstein (Jules Sitruk) returns to his family home. Batignole hides Simon in a servant's apartment on the top floor of the building but soon moves him to the cellar to avoid discovery. Simon is later joined in the cellar by his two cousins who were themselves being hidden by the concierge of another Parisian apartment building. Edmond tries to find someone to smuggle the children over the border to Switzerland but eventually determines to take them himself. Edmond and the children undertake the dangerous trip to the Swiss border, where they are nearly caught by the police. However, with the help of a kind woman and a priest, they are able to sneak over the border to safety in Switzerland.

Cast
Jules Sitruk          - Simon Bernstein
Michèle Garcia        - Marguerite Batignole 
Gérard Jugnot         - Edmond Batignole
Jean-Paul Rouve       - Pierre-Jean Lamour
Alexia Portal         - Micheline Batignole
Arthur Jugnot         - Arthur
Jean-Marie Winling    - Sacha Guitry
Marie-Hélène Lentini  - Madame Taillepied
Violette Blanckaert   - Sarah Cohen
Daphné Baiwir         - Guila Cohen 
Götz Burger           - SS Col. Spreich

Reception
Variety critic Lisa Nesselson wrote that the director "has fashioned a fine package, ready to travel". The film was a box office success in France. The 2002 French Academy of Cinema Best Young Actor award was won by Jean-Paul Rouve in this film. The film was shown at VCU French Film Festival, Cleveland International Film Festival, French Film Festival, Bergen International Film Festival where it once again received huge critical acclaim.

References

External links
 
 
 
 

French war drama films
2002 films
French World War II films
Films about Jews and Judaism
Rescue of Jews during the Holocaust
Holocaust films
Films set in the 1940s
Films shot in France
Films directed by Gérard Jugnot